Jonah from Tonga is an Australian television sitcom that is written by and starring comedian Chris Lilley. The mockumentary series follows Jonah Takalua, a rebellious 14-year-old Australian boy of Tongan descent portrayed by the Anglo-Celtic Australian Lilley in brownface. The character had been introduced in Lilley's 2007 series Summer Heights High. At the conclusion of that series, Jonah was expelled from Summer Heights High School. In this series, his father, Rocky Takalua, has sent him back to his homeland of Tonga to live with his uncle and their family in order to get Jonah's life back on track. The series was highly controversial for its use of brownface and ethnic stereotypes, much like Lilley’s other work; it has been commonly described as racist.

The six-part series was produced by Princess Pictures and Chris Lilley in conjunction with the Australian Broadcasting Corporation, and screened on ABC1 in Australia, HBO in America, and BBC Three in the UK. In New Zealand Māori Television screened the first episode on 29 July 2017, but then withdrew later episodes due to protests. The entire series was available for streaming online for one weekend from 2 May to 4 May on BBC iPlayer and ABC iview, before starting a six-week run on ABC1 on 7 May 2014 and from 8 May on BBC Three. This was a first for a major Australian TV production. The series itself was a "ratings disaster" for both the ABC and BBC. It was later announced that the entire series would screen at select cinemas in several Australian cities followed by a Q and A with Chris Lilley. These events were subsequently cancelled, with refunds given and the website created to promote them removed.

Production
On 27 November 2013, Lilley confirmed that he would be bringing back Jonah Takalua (Summer Heights High) for a new show titled Jonah from Tonga in 2014.

Melbourne-based production company Princess Pictures and Chris Lilley produced the series with Australian Broadcasting Corporation and HBO. Parts of the show are filmed at The Grange P-12 College, a western suburbs school in Melbourne.

Characters
Jonah's family
Chris Lilley as Jonah Takalua, the main character of the show. He previously appeared in Summer Heights High.
Tama Tauali'i as Moses Takalua, Jonah's younger brother who has a talent for singing. Along with Jonah, he is a member of Fobba-licious.
Isaia Noa as Rocky Takalua, Jonah's father. Rocky was previously portrayed by Tovia Matiasi in Summer Heights High.
Linda Horan as Aunty Grace, Jonah's aunt, who he shows affection for.
Jane Reupena-Niko as Melody, Jonah's cousin, whom he finds attractive and attempts to date.
Eigawe Hunt as Mary Takalua, Jonah's sister whom he does not get along with, and frequently mocks her for being overweight.
Tevita Manu as Uncle Mamafu, Jonah's uncle, who decides that Jonah can no longer live with him on Tonga.

Holy Cross High School staff
Doug Bowles as Mr Joseph, the teacher in charge of Lazarus House. He has difficulty teaching Jonah, which often leads to violence. He later retires due to the Catholic Education Office deeming that Lazarus House is unsatisfactory. 
Uli Latukefu as Mr Fonua aka "Kool Kris", a youth worker who encourages the Fobba-licious crew to enter the Feel Da Beat competition.
Meaghan Butler as Miss Hunt, a young teacher at Holy Cross High School whom all the boys find attractive.
Dorothy Adams as Sister Monica, a naive but kindly administration officer at the school in charge of the sick bay.

Other school students
Jason Moleli as Manu, Fobba-liscious member.
Lafaele Tauli'i as Israel, Fobba-liscious member.
Tana Laasia as Sonny, Fobba-liscious member.
Ilanna and Peggy, Fobba-liscious members.
Bryce Padovan as Graydon, Redhead student (“ranga”), Mary's boyfriend, the school captain and intense enemy of Jonah. The two of whom frequently get into fights.

Garingal Juvenile Justice Centre
Belinda Sharp as Therese Cooper, an officer at the Juvenile Centre.
Mose Mose as Kevin, Jonah's fat cell mate at the Juvenile Centre whom he finds boring.
Braydan Pittman (now widely known as rapper 'SESK') as Jarrod, one of the  Aboriginal boys at the prison that disrespects Jonah. Jonah says that he is a cockhead and always goes into arguments.

Reception
The series received mixed reviews, attracting criticism both for its portrayal of Tongans and for Lilley's use of brownface make-up. The series was poorly received by Tongans in Australia, and several organisations in the United States criticised HBO's decision to air it. Morgan Godfery, writing in The Guardian, described Takalua as Lilley's "most endearing character", but said that he had made Polynesians "collateral damage on [his] quest to critique racism". Godfery also suggested that because not all viewers could "identify Lilley's purpose", he was "in essence, acting out a modern minstrel show". Giles Hardie, writing for The New Daily, described the show as "quite blatantly racist – playing on the cultural traits and responses to an ethnic community", but "hitting a variety of ethnicities and in doing so lumping us all in together". However, Hardie also noted that Lilley was "one of a handful of comedians in the world" who "force society to laugh in recognition at an unacknowledged reality and, while it laughs, to engage in some healthy introspection", and concluded that the series was not "creating the stereotype", but "challenging an existing one that is found in society".

In 2017, the series was scheduled to air on Māori Television in New Zealand, however the board of the station cancelled the broadcast, saying the show perpetuated negative stereotypes of Pacific people.  The creators of the 2004 ABC TV documentary series Our Boys stated that Lilley drew inspiration for the Jonah character from their work. The subject of Our Boys recalled being "absolutely embarrassed, full of hate, angry and exploited" by the "racist" Jonah character that was based on him. The series' director, as well as a teacher at Canterbury Boys High School, also felt that the character "exploited" the Tongan students who Lilley had met while visiting the school after seeing Our Boys on television in 2004.

Episodes

Home video releases

Awards and nominations

References

External links

 
 

2014 Australian television series debuts
2014 Australian television series endings
2010s Australian comedy television series
2010s high school television series
2010s teen sitcoms
2010s Australian television miniseries
Australian Broadcasting Corporation original programming
Australian high school television series
Australian mockumentary television series
Australian television sitcoms
Australian television spin-offs
English-language television shows
HBO original programming
Television series about teenagers
Television shows set in Sydney
Ethnic humour
Television controversies in Australia
Race-related controversies in television